Wytalo Thiago de Assis Lima (born 2 January 1998), commonly known as Thiaguinho, is a Brazilian footballer who plays for Inter de Limeira as a striker.

Club career
A product of the youth academy of Ponte Preta, Thiaguinho started training with the senior team in January 2018. On 22 January, he made his first team debut, coming on as a substitute for Léo Melo in a 1–0 defeat against Linense, in Campeonato Paulista. On 10 September, his contract was terminated by the club.

On 1 January 2019, Thiaguinho signed with CSA, newly promoted to Série A.

Career statistics

References

External links

1998 births
Living people
Association football forwards
Brazilian footballers
Associação Atlética Ponte Preta players
Centro Sportivo Alagoano players
Associação Atlética Internacional (Limeira) players
Desportivo Brasil players